Axel Seeberg (11 February 1931  – 6 February 2011) was a Norwegian archaeologist. He was a professor of classical archaeology at the University of Oslo.

Biography
Seeberg was born in Oslo, Norway.  He attended upper secondary school at Ullern and graduated with a degree in art.
After finishing his secondary education in 1949, he studied classical archaeology in Oslo, as well as the 1952-53 semester at University College London under T.B.L. Webster (1905–74). After graduating, Seeberg worked at the University of Oslo from 1956. From 1974 to 2001 he served as a professor of classical archaeology.

Seeberg  was also a translator who translated works by P.G. Wodehouse. He was a fellow of the Norwegian Academy of Science and Letters from 1982.  He resided at Bestum where he died in 2011 at nearly 80 years old.

References

1931 births
2011 deaths
Archaeologists from Oslo
University of Oslo alumni
Academic staff of the University of Oslo
Members of the Norwegian Academy of Science and Letters